Bichpuri railway station (station code BCP) is a small railway station located in Bichpuri, Agra district in the Indian state of Uttar Pradesh. It belongs to North Central. Nearby stations are Pathauli railway station, Runkuta. Eleven express trains stop at Bichpuri railway station.

Trains 
 Bharatpur–Agra Fort DMU
 Agra Fort–Bandikui DMU 
 Agra Fort–Bharatpur Passenger 
 Agra Fort–Bandikui Passenger
 Bareilly–Bandikui Passenger
 Agra Fort–KasGanj Passenger
 Agra Fort–Bharatpur DMU 
 Rishikesh–Bandikui Passenger

See also
 Northern Railway zone
 Kiraoli

References 

Railway stations in Agra district
Agra railway division